Mick Brown (born 1950 in London) Educated ar Reigate Grammar School, is a British journalist who has written for several British newspapers, including The Guardian and The Sunday Times and for international publications. For many years he has contributed regularly to The Daily Telegraph. He is also a broadcaster and the author of several books.
  
Brown has written many articles about rock music and in 2007 wrote Tearing Down the Wall of Sound, a biography of record producer Phil Spector. Brown's biography of entrepreneur Richard Branson was first published in 1989. A revised edition appeared in 1998.

Brown's  book, The Dance of 17 Lives (2004), told the story of the 17th Karmapa, one of the most important figures in Tibetan Buddhism.  This book covers the life of Urgyen Trinley Dorje and clarifies the politics surrounding his recognition.

His book The Spiritual Tourist, catalogued contemporary spiritual quests around the globe, particularly in India. Brown also compiled a companion album to the book, Music for the Spiritual Tourist.

Publications

References

1950 births
Living people
English male journalists